Frederick Grace (29 February 1884 – 23 July 1964) was a lightweight boxer. He fought as Fred Grace and at the 1908 Olympic Games he became Olympic champion, defeating Matt Wells along the way. He also became the British and European amateur champion.

Biography
Born in Edmonton, Middlesex, he first became a boxer at Eton Mission Boxing Club. Making use of the facilities provided by Eton Mission, he also became proficient on the parallel bars.
 
In his early 20s, Fred incurred serious damage to his knee after an incident on his motorcycle. Fred declined the surgeon's advice to amputate and determined to regain his fitness. Subsequently, from that time to the Olympics in 1908 he never figured in any title challenges.

After the Games, Grace went on to win four Amateur Boxing Association British lightweight titles between 1909 and 1920, when boxing out of the Eton Mission ABC and Eton Boys BC respectively. However, whilst in his prime, boxing was banned from the 1912 Olympics in Stockholm and WW1 canceled out the Olympics of 1916, therefore Grace was unable to defend his title. By 1920 he was 36 years old and at the Olympics in Antwerp he won just one bout in the lightweight class before being eliminated by the eventual winner of the title, Samuel Mosberg, of the US.

Grace worked as a heating engineer for most of his life and retired in 1949. He died on 23 July 1964 at Ilford, Essex, aged 80, after being struck by a car while out walking.

References

External links

1884 births
1964 deaths
English male boxers
Lightweight boxers
English Olympic medallists
Olympic boxers of Great Britain
Boxers at the 1908 Summer Olympics
Boxers at the 1920 Summer Olympics
Olympic gold medallists for Great Britain
People from Edmonton, London
Olympic medalists in boxing
Road incident deaths in London
Medalists at the 1908 Summer Olympics
Boxers from Greater London
England Boxing champions